Sinalo Gobeni is a South African cricketer. He made his first-class debut for Boland in the 2017–18 Sunfoil 3-Day Cup on 26 October 2017. He made his List A debut for Boland in the 2017–18 CSA Provincial One-Day Challenge on 29 October 2017. In September 2018, he was named in Boland's squad for the 2018 Africa T20 Cup. He made his Twenty20 debut for Boland in the 2018 Africa T20 Cup on 14 September 2018. In September 2019, he was named in Boland's squad for the 2019–20 CSA Provincial T20 Cup.

References

External links
 

Year of birth missing (living people)
Living people
South African cricketers
Boland cricketers
Place of birth missing (living people)